Sheikh Anser Aziz is a Pakistani politician who was  mayor of Islamabad between 4 March 2016 and 1 October 2020. A member of the ruling PML-N party, Anser was elected to the office on 15 February 2016. After the issuance of Notification to handover the functions of MCI to CDA, Aziz tendered his resignation.

References

Living people
Mayors of Islamabad
Pakistan Muslim League (N) politicians
Year of birth missing (living people)